Karishma Naina Sharma, better known as the Karishma, is a Fijian-born-Indian-american International Film Producer, Writer, Television presenter and ex runway model known for her work in Australia, India, London and the US. Karishma is known predominantly for her work in the Bollywood film industry where she was the Vice President of one of the biggest film and TV studios in India, Balaji Motion Pictures, run by Television mogul, Ekta Kapoor. Karishma resides between London and Los Angeles producing International cinema, Television and theatre.

Early life 
Karishma Naina Sharma was born in the Fiji Islands to Indian Parents, Anil Rishikesh Sharma and Sushma Devi Sharma. The family shortly afterwards moved to Sydney, Australia, where her father, a chartered accountant and her Mother an entrepreneur, set up and ran several businesses. Karishma, has a younger brother, Neil Sharma who followed in her footsteps and works in the film and television industry as an assistant director based out of Sydney and Melbourne. Neil Sharma has worked on feature films Lion, Dressmaker, Dance academy and Modern family. Karishma grew up in the Sydney suburb of North Rocks and went to Tara Anglican School for Girls along with actress Rebel Wilson. Karishma and Rebel jointly received the dux of the school in Drama award upon their graduation. Post high school, Karishma received a Media and Communications degree at Macquarie University, majoring in film production. During her degree, Karishma was selected as one of an elite group of students in Australia to work at the Sydney Olympic Broadcasting Organization (SOBO), where she majored in camera. Karishma received a full scholarship in her final year of her degree to William Paterson University in New Jersey, USA, where she further developed her filmmaking and writing degree.

Career 
Post graduating, Karishma worked as a camera assistant at the Sydney Olympic games in the year 2000. Her foray into the world of film and television started in the programming department of cable Television giant, Foxtel, followed by 2 years at Sony Australia. With two major studios under her belt, Karishma chose to leave the studio system and went independent, commencing as Director’s assistant to Academy award winning director Errol Morris, interning with George Lucas on Star Wars Return of the Sith and Jane Campion’s Holy Smoke.

From the years 2002-2006, Karishma worked on over 60 television commercials, (from British Airways, Coca-Cola, Nikon, Mitsubishi) and shows, as a production manager with several of Sydney’s major production houses and television networks.

In 2006, Karishma worked on her first Bollywood film, Heyy Babyy, directed by Sajid Khan, which took her to India and the Bollywood film industry.

From April 2007 – January 2016, Karishma relocated to Mumbai, India, where she diversified her skills and ventured into writing and producing. Karishma wrote and presented TV shows for BBC Worldwide, CBS, TLC and Discovery India as well as lecturing on film and television production and creating the film syllabus at the Barry John Acting Studio in Mumbai.

Karishma was also a successful runway fashion model who featured in every major Indian designers fashion shows (Rocky S, Vikram Phadnis, Shane and Falguni Peacock, Shantanu and Nikhil, Tarun Tahiliani, Masaba Gupta, Amy Billamoria, JJ Valaya) as well as the prestigious India fashion week. Her modeling led her to anchor and host several fashion, travel and lifestyle television shows (I love style, Chronicles of Bollywood) across India, UK, USA, Middle East and Asia, where she travelled extensively. Karishma was the official anchor for Snoop Dogg in India during his snoop lion tour in 2013. Karishma also worked for Condenast as their official GQ man of the year anchor 3 years in a row (2013, 14, 15) and the India anchor for the Rob Schneider black dog comedy tour (2013).

In 2013, Karishma Naina Sharma joined one of the biggest film and television studios in India, Balaji Motion Pictures, headed by TV mogul, Ekta Kapoor. Here Karishma started as an assistant creative producer in the film division before heading the studios film development team and eventually being promoted to Vice President. At Balaji, Karishma produced Ragini MMS2, Kyaa Kool Hain Hum3, Azhar, Udta Punjab, Great Grand Masti, Half Girlfriend, Kuku Mathur Ki Jhand Ho Gayi.

After quitting her job at Balaji in February 2016, Karishma moved to the UK and opened up her own production company, Red Thread Productions and is currently in development on several Hollywood projects and a West End musical in London. Karishma Naina Sharma lives between London and Los Angeles producing international feature films, television and theatre productions.

Personal life 
Karishma is an advocate for animal, human and environmental rights and actively participates in several philanthropic causes since a young age. She is a vegetarian and believes in equality for woman, men and the LGBT community.

External links

References 

Australian film producers
Living people
Year of birth missing (living people)